The String Quintet in E major, Op. 11, No. 5 (G 275), by Luigi Boccherini was written in 1771 and published in 1775. The quintet is famous for its minuet third movement which is frequently played as a standalone piece outside of the context of the full quintet.

Background
This string quintet is a "cello quintet" in that it is scored for a string quartet (two violins, viola, cello) with a second cello as the fifth instrument.  At the time of this composition, Boccherini had been writing string quartets for about ten years.  In 1771, Boccherini's patron Don Luis, the brother of King Charles III of Spain, began to employ the Font String Quartet, composed of violist Francisco Font and his three sons. The Font String Quartet performed many of Boccherini’s works, and for a while Boccherini wrote almost exclusively for them.  He also occasionally joined the quartet as a performer himself, which prompted him to add an additional cello part to his music.

Boccherini’s first set of string quintets, his Op. 10, were also composed in 1771. His second set, Op. 11, consisted of six quintets, most notably No. 5 in E major. This became Boccherini’s most famous work even though, when published, it received no special recognition.

Structure
The quintet has four movements:

Minuet
The third movement of the quintet is notably the most famous, and is the most often performed of all the movements. It is in 3/4 time, in the key of E major modulating to A major. 

In the beginning of the movement, the first violin plays a simple, elegant melody, while the viola and cello have eighth note pizzicato. The second violin, on the other hand, has quick sixteenth note slurs which contain many string crossings. As Elisabeth Le Guin puts it in Boccherini’s Body: An Essay in Carnal Musicology, "The second violinist has no time for galanterie; he must concentrate on keeping the constant string crossings reasonable even through the length of the bow."

The first eight measures are shown below.

Arrangements
The arrangements of this quintet, especially of the minuet, are extremely numerous. The entire piece was arranged for a double viola quintet in the 18th century.

Other uses
The minuet has been used extensively in popular media including movies, television and video games, often as a backdrop or leitmotif to underscore or denote instances of gatherings or settings taking place within high society. For instance, it has been used in the films The Magnificent Ambersons (1942), The Time of Their Lives (1946), the British black comedy The Ladykillers (1955), in the music-box music in Two Rode Together (1961), and in the Soviet animated film Alice in Wonderland (1981). It was quoted by fictional rock guitarist Nigel Tufnel (portrayed by Christopher Guest) in the closing measures of the song "Heavy Duty" in the motion picture This is Spinal Tap (1984), spoofing the classical pretensions of heavy metal groups.

The British children's television programme ZZZap! used the movement in the sketches featuring Neil Buchanan's "Smart Arty" character.

In the late 1960s, the pioneering predecessor of Minnesota Public Radio used the opening section as the intro to its evening classical program.

It is used by Bryan Bishop as a "drop" on the Adam Carolla podcast.

Arrangements of the minuet are also used in the Suzuki Method.

References

External links

Performance by Musicians from Ravinia's Steans Institute from the Isabella Stewart Gardner Museum in MP3 format

Compositions by Luigi Boccherini
Boccherini
1771 compositions
Compositions in E major